The Sungai Besi station is an elevated integrated metro station in Sungai Besi, a town in the Kuala Lumpur, Malaysia. This station is served by the LRT Sri Petaling line and MRT Putrajaya Line.

Sri Petaling Line
It was first opened in 1996, along with 17 other LRT stations along the LRT line.

Putrajaya Line
The MRT station is opened to public on 16 March 2023, along with 23 other stations from Batu Kentonmen to Putrajaya.
This station is one of three elevated-to-elevated interchange stations in the country, after Titiwangsa and KL Sentral.

Planned interchange
The station will also be integrated with the proposed Maju KL KTM Komuter station on the Seremban Line.

External links 
Sungai Besi LRT Station - mrt.com.my

Ampang Line
Railway stations opened in 1996
1996 establishments in Malaysia